Sthithi is a 2003 Malayalam feature film written and directed by R. Sarath. The film tells the tale of a couple employed in the Secretariat. It stars Unni Menon, Nandini Ghosal, Master Achuth, Master Anand Pillay and Mallika Sukumaran. It is playback singer Unni Menon's debut film as an actor. He also composed a couple of songs for the film. Bengali actress and Odissi dancer, Nandini Ghosal plays the female lead. Master Anand Pillay who played the role of their son, hails from Thiruvananthapuram, and is a famous quizzer and quizmaster who had participated in the TV show Kuttikalodano Kali

Plot
Vivek and Vani are Kerala Government Secretariat employees. They live in a modest house on the outskirts of Thiruvananthapuram together with their two children. Their lives change when under threat of job losses, the trade unions call for strike action whilst at the same time their landlord asks them to leave.

Cast
 Unni Menon as Vivek
 Nandini Ghosal as Vani (Voice  By Praveena)
 Master Achuth as Raman
 Master Anand Pillay as Vishwam
 Mallika Sukumaran as Sakundala nair
 C. K. Babu as Pattom Syleshwaran
 Vellayambalam Gopalakrishnan as Narayana Pillai
Sreelatha as Mary
 Remya Nambeesan as Remya
 Vinu Abraham as Sajan
 Kollam Devarajan as PT teacher
 Ratna Purushothaman as Devaki
 Jayaraj Warrier as Devan 
Sandhya Rajendran as Devi
Leena Nair as Anamika

Soundtrack
Music: M. Jayachandran, Unni Menon, Sunny Viswanath
Lyrics: Prabha Varma, Priya Viswanath

 "Oru Chembaneer" - Unni Menon
 "Odalenna" - Sujatha Mohan
 "Let's Wipe The Tears" - Gayatri Asokan, Maya Karta

References

External links
 
 
 

2000s Malayalam-language films
Films directed by R. Sarath